is a Japanese mixed martial artist. He competed in the Lightweight division. He's the brother of professional wrestler and kickboxer Takehiro Murahama.

Mixed martial arts record

|-
| Loss
| align=center| 10-9-5
| Kotetsu Boku
| Decision (unanimous)
| Shooto: 9/26 in Kourakuen Hall
| 
| align=center| 3
| align=center| 5:00
| Tokyo, Japan
| 
|-
| Win
| align=center| 10-8-5
| Kenichiro Togashi
| Decision (unanimous)
| Shooto 2004: 5/3 in Korakuen Hall
| 
| align=center| 3
| align=center| 5:00
| Tokyo, Japan
| 
|-
| Loss
| align=center| 9-8-5
| Marcio Ramos Barbosa
| TKO (cut)
| Shooto: 7/13 in Korakuen Hall
| 
| align=center| 1
| align=center| 4:09
| Tokyo, Japan
| 
|-
| Win
| align=center| 9-7-5
| Thomas Hytten
| Decision (unanimous)
| Shooto: 3/18 in Korakuen Hall
| 
| align=center| 2
| align=center| 5:00
| Tokyo, Japan
| 
|-
| Win
| align=center| 8-7-5
| Chris Brennan
| Submission (achilles lock)
| Shooto: 1/24 in Korakuen Hall
| 
| align=center| 1
| align=center| 2:49
| Tokyo, Japan
| 
|-
| Loss
| align=center| 7-7-5
| Ryuki Ueyama
| Submission (rear naked choke)
| Deep: 5th Impact
| 
| align=center| 3
| align=center| 1:44
| Tokyo, Japan
| 
|-
| Win
| align=center| 7-6-5
| Yuji Hoshino
| Technical Submission (leg scissor choke)
| Deep: 5th Impact
| 
| align=center| 2
| align=center| 1:23
| Tokyo, Japan
| 
|-
| Win
| align=center| 6-6-5
| Kotetsu Boku
| Submission (kneebar)
| Shooto: Treasure Hunt 6
| 
| align=center| 2
| align=center| 3:17
| Tokyo, Japan
| 
|-
| Win
| align=center| 5-6-5
| Yohei Suzuki
| Decision (unanimous)
| Shooto: Gig East 8
| 
| align=center| 2
| align=center| 5:00
| Tokyo, Japan
| 
|-
| Loss
| align=center| 4-6-5
| Koji Oishi
| Decision (majority)
| Deep: 3rd Impact
| 
| align=center| 3
| align=center| 5:00
| Tokyo, Japan
| 
|-
| Loss
| align=center| 4-5-5
| Daisuke Sugie
| Submission (armbar)
| Shooto: Gig West 2
| 
| align=center| 1
| align=center| 1:32
| Osaka, Japan
| 
|-
| Loss
| align=center| 4-4-5
| Takumi Nakayama
| Technical Decision (unanimous)
| Shooto: Gig East 4
| 
| align=center| 2
| align=center| 0:00
| Tokyo, Japan
| 
|-
| Draw
| align=center| 4-3-5
| Toniko Junior
| Draw
| Shooto: To The Top 4
| 
| align=center| 2
| align=center| 5:00
| Tokyo, Japan
| 
|-
| Win
| align=center| 4-3-4
| Yohei Nanbu
| Decision (unanimous)
| Shooto: To The Top 1
| 
| align=center| 2
| align=center| 5:00
| Tokyo, Japan
| 
|-
| Draw
| align=center| 3-3-4
| Koji Takeuchi
| Draw
| Shooto: R.E.A.D. 12
| 
| align=center| 2
| align=center| 5:00
| Tokyo, Japan
| 
|-
| Win
| align=center| 3-3-3
| Sergei Bytchkov
| KO (flying knee)
| Shooto: R.E.A.D. 9
| 
| align=center| 1
| align=center| 0:11
| Setagaya, Tokyo, Japan
| 
|-
| Loss
| align=center| 2-3-3
| Ryan Bow
| Decision (majority)
| Shooto: R.E.A.D. 5
| 
| align=center| 2
| align=center| 5:00
| Tokyo, Japan
| 
|-
| Loss
| align=center| 2-2-3
| Isao Tanimura
| Decision (unanimous)
| Shooto: R.E.A.D. 2
| 
| align=center| 2
| align=center| 5:00
| Tokyo, Japan
| 
|-
| Draw
| align=center| 2-1-3
| Hiroyuki Kojima
| Draw
| Shooto: Shooter's Ambition
| 
| align=center| 2
| align=center| 5:00
| Setagaya, Tokyo, Japan
| 
|-
| Win
| align=center| 2-1-2
| Yohei Suzuki
| Decision (unanimous)
| Shooto: Renaxis 3
| 
| align=center| 2
| align=center| 5:00
| Setagaya, Tokyo, Japan
| 
|-
| Draw
| align=center| 1-1-2
| Saburo Kawakatsu
| Draw
| Shooto: Las Grandes Viajes 6
| 
| align=center| 2
| align=center| 5:00
| Tokyo, Japan
| 
|-
| Draw
| align=center| 1-1-1
| Hiroshi Tsuruya
| Draw
| Shooto: Gig '98 2nd
| 
| align=center| 2
| align=center| 5:00
| Tokyo, Japan
| 
|-
| Loss
| align=center| 1-1
| Masakazu Kuramochi
| Decision (majority)
| Shooto: Las Grandes Viajes 3
| 
| align=center| 2
| align=center| 5:00
| Tokyo, Japan
| 
|-
| Win
| align=center| 1-0
| Hiroyuki Kojima
| KO (punch)
| Shooto: Las Grandes Viajes 2
| 
| align=center| 1
| align=center| 2:31
| Tokyo, Japan
|

See also
List of male mixed martial artists

References

External links
 

1972 births
Japanese male mixed martial artists
Lightweight mixed martial artists
Mixed martial artists utilizing judo
Mixed martial artists utilizing karate
Japanese male judoka
Japanese male karateka
Living people